The 1895 Newton Athletic Association football team represented the Newton Athletic Association of Newton, Massachusetts during the 1895 college football season.  Under the leadership of various elected captains throughout the season, the Athletics compiled at least a 4–4–1 record, and outscored their opponents by a total of 76 to 46.

During the season, Newton AA and Hyde Park AA played a three game series for the honor of silver cup that was bestowed upon the champion of the "suburban league", which had apparently disbanded the year prior, and needed to resolve the question of who would keep the silver trophy indefinitely.  The cup would be given to whichever team managed to win two or more of the contests, which would turn out to be the NAA, compiling a 2–0–1 record against the fellow athletic association.

Schedule

Second team schedule

References

Newton Athletic Association
Newton Athletic Association football seasons
Newton Athletic Association football